The Battle of Casma was a confrontation that occurred on 12 January 1839, during the War of the Confederation, a conflict between Chile and the Peru–Bolivian Confederation.

The government of the Confederation hired privateers to counter the Chilean navy, offering a bounty of 200,000 pesos for the destruction of the Chilean fleet. When the Chileans lifted the blockade of Callao, four privateer ships sallied to earn that bounty. The ships were Mexicana (12 guns), Peru (10 guns), Arequipeño (6 guns) and Edmond (5 guns) under the overall command of Juan Blanchet, a former Lieutenant of the French navy.

The Chilean squadron, commanded by Robert Simpson, consisted of Confederación (22 guns), Santa Cruz (20 guns) and Valparaíso (20 guns). It was taking on firewood in Casma Bay when it was attacked by the privateers. The more heavily built Chilean ships inflicted heavy casualties on the privateers and captured the Arequipeño. Blanchet was among the killed. The other privateer ships escaped while flying French flags but were intercepted by a French warship; the privateer squadron was subsequently disbanded. Both sides claimed victory. The Chileans gained naval supremacy in the southeastern Pacific. As a reward, Simpson was promoted to the rank of Commodore in the Chilean navy in May 1839.

References

External links 
Combate Naval de Casma on the website of the Chilean Navy

1839 in Chile
1839 in Peru
Conflicts in 1839
January 1839 events
Naval battles involving Chile
Naval battles involving Peru
Naval battles of the War of the Confederation